Charles W. Meyers (August 15, 1921 – September 12, 2010) served in the California Assembly for the 19th and 24th district from 1949 - 1969. During World War II he also served in the United States Army.

References

United States Army personnel of World War II
1921 births
2010 deaths
Democratic Party members of the California State Assembly